Grant Anderson (born 21 February 1969) is a former professional rugby league footballer who played in the 1980s and 1990s. He played at club level for Castleford (Heritage № 657) (two spells), and Halifax (Heritage № 1061).

Playing career

Challenge Cup Final appearances
Grant Anderson played  in Castleford's 12-28 defeat by Wigan in the 1992 Challenge Cup Final during the 1991–92 season at Wembley Stadium, London on Saturday 2 May 1992, in front of a crowd of 77,386.

County Cup Final appearances
Grant Anderson played  in Castleford's 12-33 defeat by Leeds in the 1988 Yorkshire Cup Final during the 1988–89 season at Headingley, Leeds on Sunday 16 October 1988, and played left- in the 11-8 victory over Wakefield Trinity in the 1990 Yorkshire Cup Final during the 1990–91 season at Elland Road, Leeds on Sunday 23 September 1990.

Regal Trophy Final appearances
Grant Anderson played left- and scored a try in Castleford Tigers' 33-2 victory over Wigan in the 1993–94 Regal Trophy Final during the 1993–94 season at Headingley, Leeds on Saturday 22 January 1994.

Representative career
Grant Anderson made four appearances for Great Britain under-21s between 1989 and 1990.

Club career
Grant Anderson made his début for Castleford in the 44-8 victory over Widnes on 18 March 1987, he signed for Castleford for a second-time from Halifax on Monday 26 February 1996.

References

External links

Memory Box Search at archive.castigersheritage.com

1969 births
Living people
Castleford Tigers players
English rugby league players
Great Britain under-21 national rugby league team players
Halifax R.L.F.C. players
Place of birth missing (living people)
Rugby league centres